Banwari Lal Sharma is an Indian politician. He served as a minister from Rajasthan belonging to Indian National Congress. He was a legislator of the Rajasthan Legislative Assembly.

Biography
Sharma was elected as a legislator of the Rajasthan Legislative Assembly from Dholpur (Vidhan Sabha). He is a leader of Brahmin society in Rajasthan with his influence in Brahmin society spreading up to Dholpur, Bhind, Morena, Karauli, Madhopur.

Sharma is a veteran Congress politician having served in politics for over 50 years and has defeated the likes of Vasundhara Raje.

Sharma lost his son, Ashok Sharma, a popular leader within the BJP in 2022.

References

Indian politicians
Dholpur district
Rajasthan MLAs 1962–1967
Rajasthan MLAs 1967–1972
Rajasthan Legislative Assembly
Indian National Congress politicians from Madhya Pradesh